is a Japanese actor. He is represented with Otona Keikaku. He graduated from Ryukoku High School.

Biography
Arakawa's parents are drapers. He is an individualist actor who plays an active part in the appearance of chubby body form and round cut, and he was named , but due to depending on circumstances such as many misreading of names, he took a kanji letter from his real name, and renamed it to his current name (both of his names are presided by Otona Keikaku and named by Suzuki Matsuo).

Arakawa had made many appearances in films, dramas and advertisements. He played his first leading role in the film Fine, Totally Fine released in 2008.

Filmography

Stage

Films

TV dramas

Anime television

Documentaries

Advertisements

Music videos

See also
Suzuki Matsuo

References

External links
 

Japanese male actors
People from Saga Prefecture
1974 births
Living people